Jean Edouard Alfred Joseph Marois (November 5, 1924 – January 3, 1996) was a Canadian professional ice hockey goaltender who played three games in the National Hockey League: one with the Toronto Maple Leafs in 1943, and two with the Chicago Black Hawks in 1953. Marois served with the Canadian Forces from 1944 to 1945. He spent the majority of his career, which lasted from 1943 to 1955, with the Quebec Aces of the Quebec Senior Hockey League. He was born in Quebec City, Quebec and died in 1996 in Saint-Antoine-de-Tilly.

Career statistics

Regular season and playoffs

References

External links
 

1924 births
1996 deaths
Canadian ice hockey goaltenders
Canadian military personnel of World War II
Chicago Blackhawks players
Hershey Bears players
Ice hockey people from Quebec City
French Quebecers
Providence Reds players
Quebec Aces (QSHL) players
Shawinigan-Falls Cataracts (QSHL) players
Toronto Maple Leafs players
Toronto St. Michael's Majors players